Rudolf III, Margrave of Baden-Baden (? – 2 February 1332) was a son of Margrave Rudolf I and his wife, Kunigunde of Eberstein. After his father died in 1288, he ruled the margraviate jointly with his brothers Hesso, Herman VII and Rudolf II.

Rudolf III was married to Jutta of Strassberg. This marriage remained childless.

Margraves of Baden-Baden
Year of birth unknown
1332 deaths
13th-century German nobility
14th-century German nobility